Watta Job is a Philippine television infotainment show broadcast by GMA Network. Hosted by Chris Tiu, Heart Evangelista and John Feir, it premiered on November 17, 2012 on Sabado Star Power line up. The show concluded on February 16, 2013 with a total of 14 episodes.

Overview

The show features jobs and professions around the world, with material from Canada produced show, Powers in Motion. The show will also feature odd jobs from the Philippines. Each episode, the show's hosts, Chris Tiu, Heart Evangelista and John Feir will be interviewing Filipinos with odd and unique occupations and will doing a challenge—that is trying out the odd and difficult jobs themselves!

Ratings
According to AGB Nielsen Philippines' Mega Manila household television ratings, the pilot episode of Watta Job earned a 14.7% rating.

References

External links
 

2012 Philippine television series debuts
2013 Philippine television series endings
Filipino-language television shows
GMA Network original programming
Infotainment
Philippine television shows